Anoncia crossi is a moth in the family Cosmopterigidae. It was described by David Adamski in 1989. It is found in Mexico (Guerrero).

The length of the forewings is 6.7-8.4 mm. The ground colour of the forewings is grey. The basal wing scales are white with brown, light-brown or brownish grey at the apex. There is a patch of light-brown scales near the middle of the discal cell. The hindwings are light greyish brown.

References

Natural History Museum Lepidoptera generic names catalog

Moths described in 1989
Cosmopteriginae
Moths of Central America